Conospermum eatoniae, commonly known as blue lace, is a shrub endemic to Western Australia.

It blooms between August and October producing blue flowers. It has an upright habit and produces about 50 flowering stems per plant which produce blue flowers mostly between July and August. The plant has leafless stems and forms masses of china blue flowers in clusters.

The species was first formally described by the botanist Ernst Georg Pritzel in 1904 as part of the work by Pritzel and Ludwig Diels Fragmenta Phytographiae Australiae occidentalis. Beitrage zur Kenntnis der Pflanzen Westaustraliens, ihrer Verbreitung und ihrer Lebensverhaltnisse as published in the Botanische Jahrbücher für Systematik, Pflanzengeschichte und Pflanzengeographie. The only synonym is Conospermum crassinervium.

It is found in the Wheatbelt region of Western Australia where it grows in sandy soils.

The plant is suitable for the production of cut flowers and has a reasonable high yield. The flowers are highly sought after on Japanese markets.

References

External links

Eudicots of Western Australia
eatoniae
Endemic flora of Western Australia
Plants described in 1904
Taxa named by Ernst Pritzel